Ary Ribeiro Valadão (14 November 1918 – 9 August 2021) was a Brazilian politician, farmer, and lawyer. He served in the Chamber of Deputies of Brazil and as Governor of Goiás.

Biography
Ary was the son of Benedito Teodoro Valadão and Emília Parrodi Valadão. He began his career as a farmer and industrial worker before joining the National Democratic Union and being elected Mayor of Anicuns, serving from 1947 to 1951 and again from 1955 to 1959. He served in the Legislative Assembly of Goiás from 1959 to 1967. A graduate of the Federal University of Goiás, he also worked as a lawyer.

Valadão was elected to the Chamber of Deputies in 1967, representing Goiás until 1979. That year, he was selected by President Ernesto Geisel to serve as Governor of Goiás for a four-year term. In 1989, he rejoined the Chamber of Deputies, this time representing Tocantins and serving until 1991. In 1994, he was elected as an alternate deputy for the Reform Progressive Party.

Ary Ribeiro Valadão died in Goiânia on 9 August 2021 at the age of 102.

References

1918 births
2021 deaths
Men centenarians
Brazilian centenarians
20th-century Brazilian politicians
Members of the Chamber of Deputies (Brazil) from Goiás
Members of the Legislative Assembly of Goiás
Governors of Goiás
Mayors of places in Brazil
Federal University of Goiás alumni
People from Goiás
National Democratic Union (Brazil) politicians
National Renewal Alliance politicians
Democratic Social Party politicians
Reform Progressive Party politicians
Progressistas politicians
Podemos (Brazil) politicians
Deaths from the COVID-19 pandemic in Goiás